Hymn and Her is the name of the sixth album by the band Earlimart. It was announced in March by Aaron Espinoza and was released in the US on July 1, 2008 via Major Domo Records and Shout! Factory, and a day later in Japan, via Youth Records. Hymn and Her marks where Earlimart now consists of just the duo of Aaron Espinoza and Ariana Murray, and also is the duo's second album in under a year, following on from August 2007's Mentor Tormentor. This also marks the second time Murray sings lead vocals.  The first came when she provided lead vocals for Mentor Tormentor'''s "Happy Alone."

Allmusic awarded the album with 4 out of 5 stars, and stated that Hymn and Her "...sounds intimate, as if the bandmates have discovered how to funnel their densely populated songs into warm, mellow washes of sound."

Track listingAll songs written by Espinoza and Murray.''
 "Song For" - 2:32
 "Face Down in the Right Town" - 4:49
 "Before It Gets Better" - 4:25
 "For the Birds" - 3:19
 "God Loves You the Best" - 4:04
 "Great Heron Gates" - 3:47
 "Cigarettes and Kerosene" - 2:59
 "Teeth" - 4:31
 "Time for Yourself" - 3:56
 "Hymn and Her" - 3:27
 "Town Where You Belong" - 2:52
 "Tell Me" - 1:47
 "Sewing Up the Seams" (Japan only bonus track)
 "Underground Gardens" (Japan only bonus track)

References

2008 albums
Earlimart (band) albums